Eumorpha vitis, known as the vine sphinx, is a moth of the  family Sphingidae.

Distribution 
It lives from Argentina north through Central America, the West Indies, and Mexico to southern Arizona, Texas, Mississippi, and Florida. Strays north to Nebraska.

Description 
The wingspan is 85–105 mm. It is similar to Eumorpha fasciatus fasciatus but distinguishable by the lack of a pink marginal band on the hindwing upperside and the single straight line on the forewing upperside.

Biology 
Adults are on wing from April to May and again from July to October in Florida, from July to September in one generation in the northern part of the range and year-round in the tropics. They feed on the nectar of various flowers, including Vinca rosea.

The larvae feed on Vitis species (including Vitis vinifera), Cissus species (including  Cissus incisa, Cissus pseudosicyoides, Cissus rhombifolia, Cissus sicycoides and Cissus verticillata), Ludwigia decurrens, Ludwigia erecta, Magnolia virginiana and Parthenocissus species. There are green, yellow and purple colour morphs. Pupation takes place in burrows.

Subspecies
 Eumorpha vitis vitis (Argentina, Bolivia, Brazil, Colombia, Ecuador, Peru, French Guiana, Guyana, Paraguay, Suriname, Uruguay, Venezuela, Mexico, Belize, Guatemala, Honduras, Nicaragua, Costa Rica, Panama, the Caribbean, southern United States)
 Eumorpha vitis fuscatus - (Rothschild & Jordan, 1906) (St. Lucia, Guadeloupe and Martinique)
 Eumorpha vitis hesperidum - (Kirby, 1880) (Jamaica)

References

External links
 Vine Sphinx Butterflies and Moths of North America

Eumorpha
Moths described in 1758
Moths of South America
Taxa named by Carl Linnaeus